Marun-e Jayezan (also Romanized as Mārūn-e Jāyezān and Mārūn-e Jāyzān; also known as Mārūn) is a village in Jayezan Rural District, Jayezan District, Omidiyeh County, Khuzestan Province, Iran. At the 2006 census, its population was 148, in 31 families.

References 

Populated places in Omidiyeh County